Notonomus kosciuskianus is a species of ground beetle in the subfamily Pterostichinae. It was described by Sloane in 1902.  Specimens exist in the Museum Victoria Entomology Collection in Australia.

References

Notonomus
Beetles described in 1902